Sharana Basaveshwara Temple is a  shrine at Kalaburgi (Gulbarga), an ancient town in the north-eastern part of Karnataka.The temple is dedicated to an eminent Lingayat religious teacher and philosopher, Shri Sharana Basaveshwara,a Lingayat saint of the 18th century known for his Dasoha (Giving is earning) and Kayaka — an advancement of the Karma doctrine "You have the right to perform the work assigned to you. You have no rights to 'demand' the fruits of your labor" philosophy. The temple houses the Samadhi of Sharana Basaveshwara at the center called the garbha gudi. It also has a lake adjacent to it which attracts many devotees and tourists.

History
The temple is dedicated to an eminent Lingayat religious teacher and philosopher, Shri Sharana Basaveshwara,a Lingayat saint of the 18th century known for his Dasoha (Giving is earning) and Kayaka — an advancement of the Karma doctrine "You have the right to perform the work assigned to you. You have no rights to 'demand' the fruits of your labor" philosophy. The temple houses the Samadhi of Sharana Basaveshwara at the center called the garbha gudi. It also has a lake adjacent to it which attracts many devotees and tourists.

Annual jatra and car festival
People from across the country and abroad cutting across communal lines will converge on the sprawling temple complex to witness the historic car festival. On the occasion, the people will also have a glimpse of the silver plate (Prasada Battala) used by the saint. The Prasada Battala, which is displayed once in a year during the car festival, would be shown to the devotees. Along with the Prasada Battala, the devotees will get a chance to have a look at the Linga Sajjike (the cover used for keeping the Linga) made in Sandalwood and used by Sharanabhasaveshwara. People, particularly farmers from the region, continue the practice of donating a portion of their harvest to the temple for providing free food to pilgrims visiting the temple.

Photos Of Sharana Basaveshwara Devālaya

References

External links

196th Sharanabasaveshwara car festival begins

07-Mar-2018

https://www.google.com/url?sa=t&source=web&rct=j&url=https://www.thehindu.com/news/national/karnataka/196th-sharanabasaveshwara-car-festival-begins/article22953870.ece/amp/&ved=2ahUKEwiq6ujwrIbyAhW3yjgGHczlAbo4ChDIzwEwCHoECAYQAw&usg=AOvVaw0CLMyBqBGElmllvKtX7RJ0&amp

Karnataka`s Sharana Basaveshwara temple reopens adhering to COVID-19 protocols

3 weeks ago

Hindu temples in Kalaburagi district